Eugene Davis Saunders (July 25, 1853 – October 27, 1914) was a United States district judge of the United States District Court for the Eastern District of Louisiana.

Education and career

Born in Campbell County, Virginia, Saunders received a Bachelor of Laws from the University of Virginia School of Law in 1873. He was in private practice, Galveston, Texas from 1873 to 1875, and in New Orleans, Louisiana from 1877 to 1907. He was a Professor of Law for Tulane University Law School.

Federal judicial service

Saunders was nominated by President Theodore Roosevelt on February 11, 1907, to a seat on the United States District Court for the Eastern District of Louisiana vacated by Judge Charles Parlange. He was confirmed by the United States Senate on February 20, 1907, and received his commission the same day. His service terminated on February 8, 1909, due to his resignation. He was succeeded by Judge Rufus Edward Foster.

Later career and death

Following his resignation from the federal bench, Saunders resumed private practice in New Orleans starting in 1909. He died on October 27, 1914, in Virginia.

References

Sources
 

1853 births
1914 deaths
University of Virginia School of Law alumni
Judges of the United States District Court for the Eastern District of Louisiana
United States district court judges appointed by Theodore Roosevelt
20th-century American judges
Tulane University faculty
Tulane University Law School faculty
19th-century American judges